Chase Stillman (born March 19, 2003) is an American-born Canadian junior ice hockey right wing who is currently assigned to the Peterborough Petes of the Ontario Hockey League (OHL) as a prospect to the New Jersey Devils of the National Hockey League (NHL).

Early life
Stillman was born in St. Louis when his father, Cory was a member of the St. Louis Blues and grew up in Peterborough, Ontario once his career ended.

Playing career
Stillman played major midget hockey within the Sudbury region before he was selected by the Sudbury Wolves, in the second round, 25th overall, of the 2019 OHL Priority Selection. In his first season of major junior hockey with the Wolves in 2019–20, Stillman showed offensive potential in recording 13 goals and 34 points through 58 games and was subsequently named to the OHL First All-Rookie Team.

With the COVID-19 pandemic, suspending and later cancelling the 2020–21 season, Stillman in order to continue his development joined  the junior ranks of Danish club, Esbjerg Energy. Producing 16 points through only 8 games as at the under-20 level, Stillman was later drafted by New Jersey Devils in the first round of the 2021 NHL Entry Draft with the 29th overall selection. He was later signed to a three-year, entry-level contract with the Devils on August 21, 2021.

Returning to the OHL for the commencement of the 2021–22 season, Stillman as an alternate captain notched 20 points through 24 appearances. On January 10, 2022, Stillman was traded by the Wolves to the Peterborough Petes in exchange for Alex Pharand and 5 draft picks. Through the second half of the campaign, Stillman contributed with 10 goals and 29 points in 35 regular season games. After a first-round playoff defeat, Stillman was re-assigned by the Devils to join AHL affiliate, the Utica Comets for their playoff run on May 1, 2022.

Personal
His father, Cory Stillman, and his grandfather, Bud Stefanski, were NHL forwards; his brother Riley Stillman is an NHL defenceman.

Career statistics

Regular season and playoffs

International

References

External links
 

2003 births
Living people
Canadian ice hockey forwards
Ice hockey people from St. Louis
New Jersey Devils draft picks
National Hockey League first-round draft picks
Peterborough Petes (ice hockey) players
Sudbury Wolves players
American ice hockey forwards
Sportspeople from St. Louis
Ice hockey people from Missouri
Canadian expatriate ice hockey players in Denmark